Francis Eugene Costigan (16 December 1902 – 31 July 1977) was an Australian rules footballer who played with Fitzroy in the Victorian Football League (VFL).

Notes

References

External links 

1902 births
1977 deaths
Australian rules footballers from Melbourne
Australian Rules footballers: place kick exponents
Fitzroy Football Club players
University of Melbourne alumni

University of Melbourne alumni sportspeople
People from Fitzroy, Victoria